Tumma is an ethnic group in South Kurdufan in Sudan. They speak Katcha-Kadugli-Miri, a Nilo-Saharan language. The population of this group likely exceeds 10,000.

References
Joshua Project

Nuba peoples
Ethnic groups in Sudan